James S. McWhirr (13 January 1905 – 1976) was a Scottish professional footballer of the 1920s who played as an outside right. Born in Partick, he joined Gillingham from Glasgow-based club Ashfield in 1925 and went on to make six appearances for the club in the English Football League. He left to join Norwich City in 1926.

References

1905 births
1976 deaths
People from Partick
Scottish footballers
Footballers from Glasgow
Association football forwards
English Football League players
Gillingham F.C. players
Norwich City F.C. players
Ashfield F.C. players
Scottish Junior Football Association players